Brave New Weed: Adventures into the Uncharted World of Cannabis is a 2016 American nonfiction book by Joe Dolce about cannabis, the cannabis industry, and cannabis culture around the world, during the period of cannabis legalization in the United States.

Reception
The New York Times said it was a "hitchhiker's guide" to "huge new industry surrounding the care, consumption and enjoyment of weed".

In 2021, Rolling Stone included it in a top-eight list of books about cannabis, calling it a "well-researched book [that] drills down on the social, historical, and cultural aspects" of cannabis.

Kirkus Reviews said it was "best taken with a certain amount of skepticism" but "it offers an entertaining and informative overview of the latest changes in cannabis production and consumption".

See also
 List of books about cannabis

References

Sources

Further reading
American Book Review (excerpt at JHU Project MUSE Reefer Sanity)

External links
Joe Dolce – Brave New Weed: Adventures into the Unchartered World of Cannabis, Talks at Google, April 20, 2021

Non-fiction books about cannabis
2016 non-fiction books
American non-fiction books
American books about cannabis
HarperCollins books